The University of Garden City is a university in the Sudanese capital Khartoum, established in 2003.

History
Garden City College for Science and Technology (GCCST) was established by a government Act in 2003 (amendment 2008) as a private and not-for-profit higher education institution in Khartoum, Sudan. In 2015 it was approved as a university by the Ministry Of Higher Education.

Courses
The University offers four-year bachelor's degrees in business administration, communication science, mass communication, and information technology.

It offers five-year bachelor's degrees in architecture, civil engineering biomedical engineering  electronics engineering, nursing medicine laboratory and a two-year master's degree in business administration.

References

External links

2003 establishments in Sudan
Education in Khartoum
Science and technology in Sudan
Scientific organisations based in Sudan
Universities and colleges in Sudan